Brisbane Football Club may refer to:

Brisbane Bears, a defunct Australian rules football club (1986-1996)
Brisbane Broncos, a rugby league club that competes in the National Rugby League
Brisbane Football Club (defunct), a defunct football club that played Victorian Association (now Australian football), rugby union and soccer
Brisbane Lions, an Australian rules football club that competes in the Australian Football League (founded 1996)
Brisbane Roar FC, an association football (soccer) club that competes in the A-League